The Journal of African Earth Sciences is a peer-reviewed scientific journal published by Elsevier. It covers the earth sciences, primarily on issues that are relevant to Africa and the Middle East. The journal was established in 1983 and the editors-in-chief are P.G. Eriksson and R.B.M. Mapeo.

See also
GeoArabia
South African Journal of Geology

External links 
 

Geology journals
Geology of Africa
Elsevier academic journals
English-language journals
Publications established in 1983